Dante DeCaro (born January 26, 1981)  of Shawnigan Lake, British Columbia, is the former guitarist/songwriter of the Canadian band Hot Hot Heat.  DeCaro left the band after the recording of 2005's Elevator.

In the spring of 2005, he began playing solo acoustic shows with drummer Arlen Thompson of the Montreal band Wolf Parade. DeCaro officially joined Wolf Parade as their new guitarist in summer 2005. In 2019, Wolf Parade announced that he had left the band.

DeCaro now fronts local Shawnigan Lake band Johnny and the Moon. The band released its self-titled debut album in 2006 on Kill Devil Hills Records.

Discography

Hot Hot Heat
Knock Knock Knock (2002) Sub Pop
Make Up the Breakdown (2002) Sub Pop
Elevator (2005) Warner Bros.

Wolf Parade
 At Mount Zoomer (2008) Sub Pop
 Expo 86 (2010) Sub Pop
 Wolf Parade (EP) (2016) Self-released.
 Cry Cry Cry (2017) Sub Pop

Johnny and the Moon
 Johnny and the Moon (2006) Kill Devil Hills Records

References

External links
 Johnny And The Moon MySpace Page
Kill Devil Hills Records
News article about Hot Hot Heat split from Pitchfork Media

Wolf Parade website

1981 births
Living people
Musicians from British Columbia
Canadian songwriters
Canadian people of Italian descent
People from the Cowichan Valley Regional District
Canadian indie rock musicians
Canadian male guitarists
21st-century Canadian guitarists
21st-century Canadian male singers